Daniela Mardari (born 2 June 2001) is a Moldovan footballer who plays as a midfielder at FC Universitatea Galati in Liga 1 Feminin and has appeared for the Moldova women's national team.

Career
Mardari has been capped for the Moldova national team, appearing for the team during the UEFA Women's Euro 2021 qualifying cycle.

International goals

See also
List of Moldova women's international footballers

References

External links
 
 
 

2001 births
Living people
Moldovan women's footballers
Women's association football midfielders
Moldova women's international footballers
Moldovan expatriate women's footballers
Moldovan expatriate sportspeople in Romania
Expatriate women's footballers in Romania
Moldovan expatriate sportspeople in Italy
Expatriate women's footballers in Italy
Moldovan expatriates in Spain
Expatriate women's footballers in Spain